Michael Norman may refer to:

 Mick Norman (born 1933), English cricketer
 Michael Norman (Australian cricketer) (born 1952)
 Michael Norman (author) (born 1947), American author
 Michael Norman (sprinter) (born 1997), American track and field athlete

See also